Trea Vance Turner (born June 30, 1993) is an American professional baseball shortstop for the Philadelphia Phillies of Major League Baseball (MLB). He has previously played in MLB for the Washington Nationals and Los Angeles Dodgers.

Turner played college baseball at North Carolina State. The San Diego Padres selected him in the first round of the 2014 MLB draft and traded him to the Washington Nationals in 2015.

Developed by the Padres and Nationals primarily as a shortstop, Turner broke into the major leagues in the 2016 season as Washington's starting center fielder, before returning to what he considers his "natural position" as the Nationals shortstop in the 2017 season. He has also made a handful of major league appearances at second base. On June 30, 2021, Turner hit for the cycle for the third time, tying the MLB record for most cycles in a career.

Amateur career
Turner attended Park Vista Community High School in Lake Worth, Florida, where he played for his school's baseball team. Turner was lightly recruited by college programs, only receiving scholarship offers from NC State and Florida Atlantic University. The Pittsburgh Pirates selected Turner in the 20th round, with the 602nd overall selection, of the 2011 Major League Baseball draft. Turner opted to play college baseball for the NC State Wolfpack baseball team in the Atlantic Coast Conference (ACC) the National Collegiate Athletic Association's Division I.

As a freshman in 2012, Turner shifted from the shortstop position to play as a third baseman. That year, he had a .336 batting average, a .432 on-base percentage, and recorded 57 stolen bases while only being caught stealing four times. His 57 steals were more than the team totals of 158 Division I teams, and set an NC State record. He also tied the ACC record for steals in one game with five. Turner was named to the All-Tournament Team in the 2012 ACC Tournament.

In 2013, Turner had a .378 batting average with seven home runs, 41 runs batted in (RBIs), and 27 stolen bases. He was named to the All-ACC first team, and was named a second team All-American by Perfect Game and a third team All-American by the National Collegiate Baseball Writers Association and Baseball America. He was named a finalist for the Brooks Wallace Award, given to the best shortstop in NCAA's Division I. That summer, Turner played for the United States national collegiate baseball team. As a junior in 2014, he hit .321 with eight home runs and 26 stolen bases. After the season, he was named the winner of the Brooks Wallace Award.

Professional career

Draft and minor leagues
Aaron Fitt of Baseball America considered Turner a likely first round choice in the 2014 MLB draft. The San Diego Padres selected Turner in the first round, with the 13th overall selection. He signed on June 13, receiving a $2.9 million signing bonus. He made his professional debut three days later with the Eugene Emeralds of the Class A-Short Season Northwest League. After he batted .228 in 26 games for Eugene, the Padres promoted him to the Fort Wayne TinCaps of the Class A Midwest League, where he batted .369 in 46 games. The Padres assigned him to play for the Surprise Saguaros of the Arizona Fall League after the regular season.

On December 19, 2014, the Padres reportedly agreed to trade Turner to the Washington Nationals as a player to be named later as part of a three-team trade, in which the Padres traded Jake Bauers, Burch Smith, and René Rivera to the Tampa Bay Rays and Joe Ross to Washington, and Washington traded Steven Souza and Travis Ott to Tampa Bay, and Tampa traded Wil Myers to San Diego. This unusual arrangement was a result of Turner being ineligible to be traded before mid-June because of MLB rules that prevent players to be traded within a year of their being drafted. Turner's agent, Jeff Berry, stated to the media that it was an unfair process to force him to play half the season for a team that traded him and had no further interest in promoting his development. He claimed he would be filing a grievance through the players' union.

Looking back years later, Turner had nothing but praise for the Padres, particularly noting the time he remained while everyone waited for the trade to become official. "Even after I got traded, the staff I had, Morgan Burkhart, those guys worked with me and helped me as much as anybody. I remember not feeling like I was on the outside, even though I was being traded. I appreciated that. That's something I'll never forget."

In 2015, Turner reported to spring training with the Padres as a non-roster invitee, and the Padres assigned him to the San Antonio Missions of the Class AA Texas League. He hit .322 with five home runs and 35 RBIs with 11 stolen bases for San Antonio.

Washington Nationals

2015: Major league debut
On June 14, 2015, Turner was sent to the Nationals to complete the trade made in December, and was assigned to the Harrisburg Senators of the Class AA Eastern League. After playing ten games for Harrisburg, the Nationals promoted Turner to the Syracuse Chiefs of the Class AAA International League. Turner represented the Nationals at the 2015 All-Star Futures Game.

On August 21, 2015, the Nationals promoted Turner to the major leagues. He made his MLB debut that night. Turner went nine at-bats before collecting his first MLB hit on September 3, beating out a ground ball to reach first base safely.  He finished the 2015 season with a .225 batting average through 40 at-bats with one home run and one RBI.

2016: Rookie of the Year runner up
In spring training in 2016, Turner competed with Danny Espinosa and Stephen Drew to be the Nationals starting shortstop. The Nationals optioned Turner to Syracuse at the end of spring training. Turner was called up on June 3, 2016, for a three-game series against the Cincinnati Reds. He went 3-for-3 with a walk in his first game of the season at MLB, playing second base and shortstop. He was optioned back to Syracuse at the end of the series, as first baseman Ryan Zimmerman was reactivated from paternity leave.

With Michael A. Taylor and Ben Revere turning in lackluster offensive performances as the Nationals' primary center fielders and Espinosa performing well as the team's everyday shortstop, Turner began getting starts in center field with the Nationals midway through the season. He debuted in center field on June 27, his first professional appearance as an outfielder and, after being recalled by the Nationals in July, Turner made his first major league start in center field on July 26.

Turner won the Major League Baseball Rookie of the Month Award in the National League for his performance in August 2016, hitting .357 on the month with five home runs and 11 stolen bases. He finished second in National League Rookie of the Year Award balloting to Corey Seager despite playing in only 73 of the 162 games that season.

2017: Return to shortstop and injuries
In 2017, Turner moved back to his natural position of shortstop after the club acquired Adam Eaton to play center field and traded starting shortstop Danny Espinosa to the Los Angeles Angels. On April 9, Turner was placed on the 10-day disabled list due to tightness in his hamstring. On April 25, Turner hit for the cycle against the Colorado Rockies. The following night, Turner came a triple shy of back-to-back cycles.

Turner stole four bases against the New York Mets in a June 18 game to set a personal best and tie Marquis Grissom (in 1992 for the Montreal Expos against the San Francisco Giants) for the franchise record. He tied the record again with four steals off the Chicago Cubs in just three innings on June 27, helping the Nationals to a team record of seven stolen bases in the game. Two days later, Turner was hit on the right wrist by a fastball from Cubs reliever Pedro Strop and suffered a non-displaced fracture, sending him to the 10-day disabled list for the second time in the season. Turner told The Washington Post'''s Thomas Boswell it was the first time since he was 12 that he had broken a bone, though he claimed the injury "didn't feel that bad" after Strop's pitch hit him, and he remained in the game for an inning and a half before being lifted for a defensive substitute. The Nationals purchased the contract of infielder Adrián Sánchez from the Class-AAA Syracuse Chiefs to take Turner's place on the roster. Turner was activated from the disabled list on August 28 and made his return to the lineup the following night against the Miami Marlins.

2018: NL stolen bases leader

In 2018, Turner continued his climb toward stardom. On July 5, Turner had eight RBIs and hit his first career grand slam during a franchise-record 9-run comeback against the Miami Marlins. On July 8, Turner was announced as one of the five candidates in the 2018 All-Star Final Vote.

He finished the season with an NL-leading 43 stolen bases. For the season, he batted .271/.344/.416. He also was 3rd in the league in power-speed number (26.4). He had the fastest baserunning sprint speed of all major league shortstops, at 30.1 feet/second.

2019: World Series championship

On April 2, 2019, Turner broke his right index finger while attempting to bunt against the Philadelphia Phillies; he did not play again until May 17. On July 23, Turner hit for the cycle for the second time in his career, and for the second time against the Colorado Rockies. This time it occurred at Nationals Park and was the first cycle ever hit against the Rockies away from Coors Field. During the 2019 regular season, Turner hit .298/.353/.497 with 19 home runs in 122 games. He finished second in the NL with 35 stolen bases, behind Ronald Acuña Jr. who had 37. Turner also recorded the fastest sprint speed of all major league shortstops, at 30.3 feet/second (9.2 meters/sec).

In the NL Wild Card Game, Turner hit his first career postseason home run off of Brandon Woodruff of the Milwaukee Brewers. The Nationals defeated the Brewers and went on to win the World Series over the Houston Astros, earning the first championship in franchise history. On November 16, Turner underwent surgery on his right index finger.

2020: Seventh in NL MVP voting
In 2020, Turner batted .335/.394/.588 with 12 home runs in 59 games during the shortened 60-game season. He led the National League with 78 hits and four triples and led all shortstops in average, OBP, SLG, and wRC+. Turner finished 7th in NL MVP voting.

2021: Last year in Washington and tying the MLB cycle record

On June 30, 2021 (Turner's 28th birthday) against the Tampa Bay Rays, Turner hit for the cycle a third time, tying the MLB record for career cycles with John Reilly, Bob Meusel, Babe Herman, and Adrián Beltré. He hit a single in the first inning, a double in the third inning, a home run in the fourth inning, and a triple in the sixth inning.

Los Angeles Dodgers
2021: Batting championship and 100 career home runs
On July 30, 2021, Turner was traded to the Los Angeles Dodgers along with Max Scherzer in exchange for Josiah Gray, Keibert Ruiz, Gerardo Carrillo, and Donovan Casey. Starting off as a shortstop for the team, Turner moved to second base when Corey Seager returned from the injured list.  On September 26, 2021, Turner hit his 100th career home run off of Humberto Mejía of the Arizona Diamondbacks.  Turner finished the 2021 season leading the majors with a .328 batting average and 195 base hits, his second consecutive season leading the major leagues in hits. He slashed .328/.375/.536 with a 145 OPS+.  He also led the National League with 32 stolen bases and 319 total bases. He had the fastest sprint speed of all major league players, at 30.7 feet/second. With the Dodgers, he hit .338 with 10 homers, a 149 OPS+ and 11 steals. In the playoffs, he had two hits in four at-bats in the Wild Card Game, three hits in 22 at-bats (.136) in the 2021 NLDS and six hits in 25 at-bats (.240) with one steal in the 2021 NLCS.

2022: All-Star and First Team All-MLB
On March 22, Turner signed a one-year, $21 million, contract with the Dodgers to avoid salary arbitration, and he returned to playing shortstop after Seager departed as a free agent. On July 8, 2022, Turner was named the starting shortstop for the 2022 All-Star Game. He recorded his 1,000th career hit on August 29, 2022, a 10th inning single off Marlins pitcher Huascar Brazoban. 

For the season, Turner hit .298 with 21 home runs, 100 RBI and 27 stolen bases. He also led the league in plate appearances (708) and at-bats (652), and led the majors with 33 infield hits.

Philadelphia Phillies
On December 8, 2022, Turner signed a 11-year contract worth $300 million with the Philadelphia Phillies.

 International career 
On August 31, 2022, Turner announced that he would represent the United States in the 2023 World Baseball Classic. During a quarterfinal game against Venezuela, Turner hit a game winning grand slam.

Personal life
Turner was born in Boynton Beach, Florida, on June 30, 1993, to parents Mark and Donna. He has an older sister, Teal. He met his future wife, Kristen Harabedian, when they both attended North Carolina State, where Harabedian was a gymnast. Harabedian had also competed in high school gymnastics, and, on January 18, 2010, was featured by Faces in the Crowd in Sports Illustrated''. Turner and Harabedian married in November 2018 at St. Joseph's Catholic Church in Washington, D.C. In February 2021, the couple announced the birth of their first child, a son. They reside in Palm Beach Gardens, Florida during the offseason. They previously owned a home in Arlington, Virginia, but sold it after Turner was traded to the Dodgers.

During the 2018 season, Twitter posts Turner made during college using derogatory language, particularly anti-gay and mentally disabled slurs, became public. Turner became the third player to have offensive tweets from his past discovered in the month of July 2018, following Josh Hader and Sean Newcomb. Turner apologized for the social media postings and refused to use his being a teenager at the time as an excuse at a tearful press conference called before the Nationals' next game.

See also

 List of Major League Baseball annual triples leaders
 List of Major League Baseball players to hit for the cycle
 List of North Carolina State University people
 Los Angeles Dodgers award winners and league leaders

References

External links

1993 births
Living people
All-American college baseball players
Baseball players from Florida
Eugene Emeralds players
Fort Wayne TinCaps players
Harrisburg Senators players
Los Angeles Dodgers players
Major League Baseball center fielders
Major League Baseball second basemen
Major League Baseball shortstops
National League All-Stars
National League batting champions
National League stolen base champions
NC State Wolfpack baseball players
People from Lake Worth Beach, Florida
San Antonio Missions players
Silver Slugger Award winners
Surprise Saguaros players
Syracuse Chiefs players
United States national baseball team players
Washington Nationals players
Sportspeople from Boynton Beach, Florida
2023 World Baseball Classic players